Potassium feldspar refers to a number of minerals in the feldspar group, and containing potassium:
Orthoclase (endmember formula KAlSi3O8), an important tectosilicate mineral that forms igneous rock
Microcline, chemically the same as orthoclase, but with a different crystalline structure
Sanidine, the high-temperature form of potassium feldspar 
Adularia, a more ordered low-temperature variety of orthoclase or partially disordered microcline
Amazonite (sometimes called "Amazon stone"), a green variety of microcline

Feldspar